Billy Baumhoff (born February 7, 1973 in St. Louis, Missouri) is a retired American soccer midfielder who spent four seasons in the USISL and was a member of the Kansas City Wiz in 1996, but never entered a first team game.  He was also a member of the United States U-16 men's national soccer team at the 1989 FIFA U-16 World Championship

He attended Christian Brothers College High School, graduating in 1991.  In 1988, Baumhoff and his teammates won the Missouri State High School championship.  He then attended the University of South Carolina, playing on the men's soccer team from 1991 to 1994.  In 1993, the Gamecocks went to the NCAA championship game where they fell to the University of Virginia.  In 1994 and 1995, he played for the St. Louis Knights in the USISL.  In February 1996, the Kansas City Wiz selected Baumhoff in the 13th round (126th overall) of the 1996 MLS Inaugural Player Draft.   On April 17, 1996, the Wiz placed him on the developmental roster.  He spent part of the 1996 season on loan with the Minnesota Thunder in the USISL.  The Wiz waived him on November 8, 1996 and on February 2, 1997, the Colorado Rapids picked him in the 2nd round (11th overall) of the 1997 MLS Supplemental Draft.  The Rapids waived him on March 14, 1997 and on July 8, 1997, he signed with the Thunder for the remainder of the season.

He was a member of the United States U-16 men's national soccer team at the 1989 FIFA U-16 World Championship where he played one game, a 2-2 tie with Australia.

Baumhoff coaches the Christian Brothers College High School freshman soccer team.

References

1973 births
Living people
American soccer players
St. Louis Knights players
Soccer players from St. Louis
South Carolina Gamecocks men's soccer players
Minnesota Thunder players
USISL players
Sporting Kansas City players
United States men's youth international soccer players
USL Second Division players
USISL Select League players
A-League (1995–2004) players
Colorado Rapids draft picks
Association football midfielders